A military police vehicle is a vehicle used by the military police entities of a country's armed forces.

By Country

Americas

Brazil
The Army Police of the Brazilian Army (Portuguese: Polícia do Exército, PE) has dark gray Toyota Hilux trucks with "Polícia do Exército" written in yellow. The police vehicles of the Brazilian Military Police vary widely as each state manages their own "military police," which are classed as reserve troops and ancillary forces of the Brazilian Army

Canada

Canadian Forces Military Police patrol vehicles are painted white with two red stripes and a police logo. CFMP Reserve and regular field units have trucks painted military green that say "Military Police Militaire" and have a red topper light. Because of the terrain on certain bases, some units also have bicycles, all-terrain vehicles (ATV), snowmobiles and watercraft.

United States

When forward deployed, United States military police units customarily employ HMMWVs or internal security vehicles called the M1117 Armored Security Vehicle. When conducting on-post law enforcement, military police typically employ patrol cars similar to those used by civilian police departments. Overseas U.S. Military installations may employ patrol cars similar to those of their host country.

Special agents of the United States Army Criminal Investigation Division or other military special investigation branches, may employ unmarked civilian vehicles in the course of their duties within the United States. In combat zones, these agents employ the same tactical vehicles as regular military police units.

Asia

India

The Corps of Military Police of the Indian Army often uses white Maruti Gypsys for their missions. The Indian Air Force Police uses similar vehicles, in a sky blue color instead.

Israel 
The Israel Defense Forces Military Police Corps use 2013 Hyundai i35 Elantra (used by "Yamlat" unit) and 2017 Hyundai i25. Vehicles no longer in service include Daihatsu Applause, Renault Mégane, Chevrolet Optra, Subaru B4, Ford Mondeo, Kia Rio.

Japan

The Japan Self-Defense Forces utilize white vehicles equipped with sirens for their Military Police duties.

Taiwan
The Republic of China Military Police uses a fleet of black patrol cars with white writing on the side. These vehicles are most commonly Volkswagen Passats, Isuzu Rodeos, and Ford Escapes.

Europe

Germany

The Feldjäger are the military police of the Bundeswehr, Germany's armed forces. They mainly utilize the Mercedes-Benz Vito and the Nissan Patrol for regular patrol duties. When deployed abroad, the ATF Dingo and SSA Wolf are often used for military police duties.

Poland

The Military Gendarmerie (Polish: Żandarmeria Wojskowa, abbreviated ŻW) utilizes the Skoda Octavia in dark green with a white stripe and "ƵW" written on each front door for patrol duties.

Russia

The Military Automobile Inspection (Russian: Военная автомобильная инспекция, ВАИ), the traffic police service of the Military Police of Russia utilizes silver patrol cars with blue striping for their duties. Tactical vehicles are military green with red stripes.

United Kingdom

When in the field, members of the service police organisations use Land Rovers with typical police equipment and signs reading "MILITARY POLICE". When in garrison or on-shore, they use regular civilian-type patrol cars, but with appropriate RMP, RAFP or RNP markings. Special Investigation Branches may utilise unmarked patrol cars in their duties.

Oceania

Australia

The Royal Australian Corps of Military Police is the branch of the Australian Army responsible for military police duties. They utilise white patrol vehicles with blue and white Sillitoe tartan markings and "Military Police" written in red. The Naval Police Coxswain Branch of the Royal Australian Navy and Royal Australian Air Force Police use similar patrol cars, with "Naval Police" and "Service Police" written instead of "Military Police," respectively.

Gallery

See also

 Military Police

References

External links
 An online Flickr picture collection of British Military Police vehicles form all three services.

Vehicles
Police